Heshin (also romanized as Heshīn; also known as Gishavan) is a village in Sanjabad-e Jonubi Rural District, Firuz District, Kowsar County, Ardabil Province, Iran. As of the 2006 census, its population consisted of 137 families and 538 distinct individuals.

References 

Towns and villages in Kowsar County